AMOS-8 is a planned Israeli communications satellite, one of the Spacecom AMOS series, that is built by Israel Aerospace Industries (IAI), a defense and aerospace company, for replaced AMOS-6 and AMOS-7

Terminology 
AMOS stands for "Affordable Modular Optimized Satellite" and is also an allusion to the prophet Amos. This spacecraft is the second implementation of the AMOS-4000 satellite bus, the first was the AMOS-4. It is one of a AMOS series of satellites built by Israel Aerospace Industries (IAI).

History 
AMOS-8 will include flexible high power Ku-band, Ka-band, and S-band payloads with steerable antennas to enable customers to deliver various added value services. Spacecom had originally selected in March 2018 SSL to build the satellite, for US$112 million, but in September 2018 it was announced, that the satellite would not be built by SSL, but by the state-owned Israel Aerospace Industries (IAI) to preserve the satellite building capability, although at a much higher price. A contract has not yet been issued. AMOS-8 will be similar to the original AMOS-6. The satellite is designed to provide service for a minimum of 16 years. AMOS-8 will be launched in 2023. It will be located with AMOS-3 at 4° West.

See also 

 List of Falcon 9 launches

References

External links 
 Amos-Spacecom

AMOS-8
Communications satellites of Israel
2023 in spaceflight
SpaceX commercial payloads
2023 in Israel